In law, a comminatory is a clause inserted into a law, edict, patent, etc., describing a punishment that is to be imposed on delinquents, which, however, is not in practice executed with the rigor that is conveyed in the description, or not even executed at all.

Thus, in some countries, when an exile is enjoined not to return on pain of death, it is deemed a comminatory penalty, since, if he did return, it is not strictly executed, but instead the same threat is laid on him again, which is more than comminatory.

See also
Colloquy (law)

References

Punishments